Tumtum ("hidden") is a term that appears in Jewish Rabbinic literature. It usually refers to a person whose sex is unknown because their genitalia are hidden, undeveloped, or difficult to determine. Although they are often grouped together, the tumtum has some halachic ramifications distinct from those of the androgynos (אנדרוגינוס), who has both male and female genitalia. Although tumtum does not appear in the Scripture, it does in other literature. Reform Rabbi Elliot Kukla writes, "The  tumtum  appears  17  times  in  the  Mishna;  23  times  in  the  Tosefta;  119  times  in  the  Babylonian Talmud; 22 times in the Jerusalem Talmud and hundreds of times in midrash, commentaries, and halacha."

In the Talmud, Yevamot 64a, Rabbi Ammi says that the Biblical figures Abraham and Sarah were said to have been born tumtum and infertile, and then miraculously turned into a fertile husband and wife in their old age. Rabbi Ammi points to Isaiah 51:1–2, saying that the references to "the rock from where you were hewn, and to the hole of the pit from where you were dug" symbolize their genitals being uncovered and remade.

Etymology 

The eleventh century dictionary, the Aruch, says the word tumtum came from atum (אטום) "sealed."

Physical characteristics 

The classical description of the physical characteristic of tumtum says they have a membrane of skin hiding female or male genitals. One form of a tumtum has exposed testicles and an unexposed penis. As long as the skin covers their genitals, they are considered doubtful men and women. As long as the skin is present, they are not able to be circumcised or have sex. Their status as tumtum can be changed by surgery, though they will still always have different rights and duties than those of other men and women. In the Talmud, one adult tumtum from the town of Bairi had surgery to cut away this skin, so he was able to be re-categorized as a man. He later fathered seven children. Rabbis differ in whether tumtum are legally obligated to have that surgery. 

This description does not exactly match any intersex condition known today.

Gender role 

Scholars today differ in whether they see tumtum as a distinct gender. The 2nd century CE Mishna, the oldest compendium of Jewish oral law, brings the opinion of Rabbi Meir that tumtum is not a distinct gender but a state of doubt between male and female - "sometimes he is a man and sometimes he is a woman". This is the position of traditional Judaism. According to transgender Reform Rabbi Elliot Kukla tumtum is one of six genders in classical Judaism, along with male, female, androgynos, ay'lonit (a person who was assigned female at birth, but is barren and perhaps masculinized), and saris (a eunuch by birth either through human intervention, or a person who was assigned male at birth but later became feminized). This, he claims, is an example of how the Western gender binary is not universal to all cultures. 

Although the definition of tumtum is based on physical characteristics, this is used as a basis for social roles, duties, and prohibitions. This can be considered effectively a gender role. The strictest gender-dependent obligations or prohibitions apply to tumtum, because if the tumtum might really be a man or woman, laws for neither men nor women should be broken. Positive commandments from which women are exempted are considered binding on a tumtum. The Mishnah (Zavim, 2, 1) says that tumtum and androgynos have both men's and women's khumrot, meaning that where the law is stricter towards men than women, they are treated as men, but where the law is stricter towards women, they are treated as women.

See also 
 Androgynos
 Gender and Judaism
 Intersex people and religion
 Intersex people in history

References

Further reading 
 Rabbi Elliot Kukla. "A Created Being of Its Own: Toward a Jewish Liberation Theology for Men, Women and Everyone Else." 2006. TransTorah. 

Gender and Judaism
Gender systems
Talmud concepts and terminology
Intersex in religion and mythology
Androgyny